Qaleh-ye Mirza (also Romanized as Qal‘eh-ye Mīrzā) is a village in Qeshlaq Rural District, in the Central District of Khorrambid County, Fars Province, Iran. At the 2006 census, its population was 300, in 64 families.

References 

Populated places in Khorrambid County